The 1995 MTV Europe Music Awards took place at the Le Zénith in Paris, France and were hosted by Jean-Paul Gaultier.

The French nuclear testing in the South Pacific got the most attention at the ceremony.
Jon Bon Jovi during his speech for winning the award for Best Rock said: "The only enemy is ignorance. Peace, people. Let's get rid of all this nuclear testing." and Bono said: "What a city, what a night, what a crowd, what a bomb, what a mistake, what a wanker you have for a President" referring to nuclear testing and then-French President Jacques Chirac. Greenpeace, the environmental group that has staged creative and controversial protests around the testing site at Mururoa Atoll, took the Free Your Mind award for its campaign against the underground nuclear blasts.
"Stop abusing the earth," urged Madonna in a videotaped segment before the designer agnès b. picked up the award for Greenpeace.

Nominations
Winners are in bold text.

Performances
Simply Red — "Fairground"
East 17 — "Thunder"
H-Blockx — "Risin' High"
David Bowie — "The Man Who Sold the World"
Blur — "The Universal"
Bon Jovi — "Hey God"
The Cranberries — "Zombie"
MC Solaar and Diana King — "Is This Love"
Take That — "Back for Good"

Appearances
Carla Bruni and Robbie Williams — presented Best Rock
Eva Herzigova and Jarvis Cocker — presented Best Male
Patsy Kensit and Michael Hutchence — presented Breakthrough Artist
Jean-Paul Gaultier and Karen Mulder — presented Best Director
Jean-Claude Van Damme — presented Best Female
Zucchero and Nina Hagen — presented Best Group
agnès b. — accepted Free Your Mind on behalf of Greenpeace
Kylie Minogue and Ray Cokes — presented Best Live Act
Jovanotti and Sven Väth — presented Best Dance
The Edge and Björk — presented Best Song

See also
1995 MTV Video Music Awards

References

1995
1995 music awards
1995 in Paris
November 1995 events in Europe
Music in Paris